The Ligurian Prealps (in Italian Prealpi Liguri or  Alpi Liguri Orientali, in French Préalpes liguriennes) are a mountain range in northwestern Italy.
They belong to the Ligurian Alps and are located between the regions of Piemonte (province of Cuneo) and Liguria (province of Savona, province of Imperia).

History 

Human settlement in the Ligurian Prealps is very ancient and left  significant traces in various places, also thanks to a number of natural caves which eased the conservation of prehistoric remains and artifacts. The area was involved in the Italian campaigns of Napoleone Bonaparte and several fortresses were built on the chain summit and mountain passes. Before the industrial revolution and the spreading of  motorized traffic the area was characterized by the presence of small rural settlements alongside permanently inhabited villages. Around the end of the XIX century these mountains, like many others in the Italian peninsula, appeared quite barren due to extensive deforestation. Ligurian Prealps had an important role during the Italian resistance movement as refuge and battleground for many  partisan units. The Ligurian partisans' deeds on the Prealps were narrated, among others, by Italo Calvino in some of his masterworks. During the post-war period, like in other low-altitude mountain zones of Italy, Ligurian Prealps suffered depopulation and woodland spread in many former cultivated areas which had been abandoned. This increase in woodland is seen as one of the main reasons of the diffusion of wolves in the Ligurian Prealps starting from their refuge areas in the Central Apennine. This later made it possible for the species to recolonize the entire Alpine chain.

Geology 
In the Ligurian Prealps are well represented conglomerates and other sedimentary rocks as marls, sandstones, limestones and clay minerals.

Classification

According to the SOIUSA Ligurian Prealps are an Alpine subsection classified as it follows:
 Main part = Western Alps
 Major sector = Southwestern Alps
 Alpine section = Ligurian Alps
 Alpine subsection = Ligurian Prealps (Code = I/A-1.I)

Borders
Rotating clockwards, the limits of the Ligurian Prealps are: Colle di Nava (which divides them from the Alpi del Marguareis, the other subsection of the Ligurian Alps), river Tanaro, Cevetta stream, Colle di Cadibona (which divides them from the Apennine mountains), Lavanestro stream, Savona, Ligurian Sea, Albenga, Arroscia Valley, colle di Nava.  The W border of the chain is the Colle di Nava not just according to the SOIUSA, but also for the CAI, as stated in its volume Alpi Liguri (Guida dei Monti d'Italia, 1981).

Partition

The specificities of the Prealpi Liguri amidst the Alpine chain, recognized in 2005 by the SOIUSA which considers them as a self-standing subsection, during the first half of the XX century have been backed by the ligurian alpinist Jacques Guiglia Ligurian Prealps are classified into one Alpine supergroup, three groups and nine sub-groups as it follows:
 Catena Settepani-Carmo-Armetta (A)
 Gruppo del Monte Settepani  (A.1)
Costiera Bric Quoggia-Monte Alto or Gruppo del Monte Settepani strictu sensu  (A.1.a)
Costiera del Monte Settepani or Displuvio Bormida di Pállare - Bormida di Millesimo (A.1.b)
Costiera Bric dei Pinei-Rocca Roluta or Displuvio Bormida di Pállare - Bormida di Mállare (A.1.c)
Costiera del Bric Gettina or Displuvio Porra - Marémola (A.1.d)
 Gruppo del Monte Carmo (A.2)
Costiera del Monte Carmo or Gruppo del Monte Carmo strictu sensu  (A.2.a)
Dorsale Spinarda-Sotta or Displuvio Tanaro - Bormida di Millesimo (A.2.b)
 Gruppo Galero-Armetta (A.3)
Costiera Galero-Armetta or Gruppo del Monte Galero e del Monte Armetta strictu sensu  (A.3.a)
Dorsale del Pizzo Castellino or Displuvio Neva - Pennavaira (A.3.b)
Dorsale della Rocca delle Penne or Displuvio Pennavaira - Arroscia (A.3.c)
The colle del Melogno takes apart Gruppo del Monte Settepani and Gruppo del Monte Carmo, while the colle San Bernardo divides the Gruppo del Monte Carmo from the Gruppo Galero-Armetta, the latter being the highest area of the mountain chain.

Main passes

Some important passes in the Ligurian Prealps are listed below:

 Colle di Cadibona - ,
 Giogo di Toirano - ,
 Colle Scravaion - ,
 Colle di Nava - ,
 Colle San Bernardo - ,
 Colle del Quazzo - ,
 Colle del Melogno - .

Main summits

Among the chief summits of the Ligurian Prealps can be listed:

Monte Armetta - ,
Monte Galero - ,
Monte della Guardia - ,
Rocca delle Penne - ,
Monte Carmo di Loano - ,
Monte Settepani - ,
Monte Spinarda - ,
Bric Agnellino - ,
Monte Cianea - ,
Monte Camulera - ,
Rocca Barbena - ,
Ronco di Maglio - ,
Monte Peso Grande - ,
Monte Alpe - ,
Bric Gettina - .

Nature conservation 

On the Ligurian Prealps have been established some Natura 2000 SCIs; among them can be remembered Monte Carmo - Monte Settepani (code:IT1323112), Monte Galero (code:IT1323920), Monte Ravinet - Rocca Barbena (code:IT1324011), Monte Spinarda - Rio Nero (code: IT1323014), Bric Zerbi (code:IT1323021), Castell'Ermo - Peso Grande (code:IT1324818) and Ronco di Maglio (code:	IT1322216).

References

Bibliography

 
 

 
Mountain ranges of the Alps
Mountain ranges of Liguria
Mountain ranges of Piedmont